College is a subway station on Line 1 Yonge–University in Toronto, Ontario, Canada. It is located at Yonge Street and College Street/Carlton Street. Wi-Fi service is available at this station.

History
The address originally given to the station was 448 Yonge Street, which is still used on TTC system maps, but the TTC official website uses 3 Carlton Street.

Station description

The station lies under Yonge Street south from College and Carlton streets. The entrances on the northeast and southeast corners of the intersection are stairwells directly from the sidewalk. At the southwest corner the entrance is through the former Eaton's store at College Park, with escalators connecting from the street and additional stairs to the station. These three entrances join to the concourse, below the street at the north end of the station, where the collector's booth, turnstiles and a Gateway Newstands are located. Below this, on the lowest level, are the two side platforms which can be reached by escalators and stairs. There are no elevators in this station, which means it is not accessible for persons with physical disabilities.

The TTC is constructing a second entrance at College Station to open in Q4 2023. The second entrance will be south of the main entrance, and riders will be able to access it from the basement level of the College Park building. The second entrance will have a concourse level under Yonge Street with Presto fare gates, and an elevator and a staircase to each of the north- and southbound platforms. Riders can use the College Park elevators from street level and a passage to reach the new concourse where riders use either a short staircase or a ramp to enter the concourse.

Architecture and art

The station features Hockey Knights in Canada, a pair of murals that are named after Hockey Night in Canada; one depicting the Toronto Maple Leafs on the southbound side and facing the Montreal Canadiens on the northbound side, depicting the decades-old rivalry between the two clubs. They were created by Charles Pachter in 1984, when the Toronto Maple Leafs still played at nearby Maple Leaf Gardens.

Before proceeding with the design, the TTC sought to obtain permission from both clubs. The Canadiens agreed as did Maple Leaf general manager Gerry McNamara. However, when Maple Leafs owner Harold Ballard learned of the plan to feature both teams, he refused permission to use the Leafs insignia unless plans for the Canadiens mural were scrapped. The TTC thus moved to remove the logos from the murals, until chairman Julian Porter, himself a lawyer knowledgeable on copyright issues, intervened and decided to take Ballard to court, believing that the artistic works could make free use of the logo even without Ballard's permission. TTC commissioner June Rowlands also intervened insisting that all the players wear helmets, to set an example of safety for the city's youth.

Subway infrastructure in the vicinity 
North of the station, the tunnel turns off-street, paralleling Yonge Street to the east. South of the station, the subway continues under Yonge Street to Dundas station.

In early 2011 the TTC began work to re-install a double crossover south of the station. The crossover will allow trains to turn back at the station, allowing for more flexibility during emergencies. The crossover had existed from the day the subway opened until the mid-1980s when it was removed due to financial, maintenance and safety concerns and because it was not regularly used. The original crossover was not powered or signaled, meaning that supervisory personnel had to be on scene to manually operate the switches, and ensure safe train passage. On November 21, 2020, Automatic Train Control was activated at College station, allowing the crossover to be remotely operated for train turnbacks.

Nearby landmarks 
Nearby landmarks include the College Park mall, the College Park courts, the Residences of College Park, the Toronto Police Headquarters, and Maple Leaf Gardens. Some Toronto Metropolitan University students use this station though the campus is situated closer to the next station, Dundas.

Surface connections 

A transfer is required to connect between the subway system and these surface routes:

TTC routes serving the station include:

References

External links 

Line 1 Yonge–University stations
Railway stations in Canada opened in 1954